The Fiat AS.1 was a light touring aircraft developed in Italy in the late 1920s.

Design and development
The AS.1 was a basic and conventional design: a parasol wing monoplane with tailskid undercarriage and seating for two in tandem open cockpits. The type proved extremely popular, and the production run would eventually extend to over 500 machines, with roughly half of these purchased by the Regia Aeronautica as trainers and liaison aircraft. Construction was of wood throughout, covered by plywood, fabric, and (around the nose) metal. A later development, designated TR.1 featured a metal structure and a shorter span wing.

AS.1s were used successfully in a number of competitions and record-breaking events. In August 1929, they participated in the Challenge 1929 international contest, and in January 1930, an AS.1 piloted by Renato Donati with mechanic Gino Capannini was used to set endurance, distance, and altitude records in its class, respectively 29 h 4 min 14 s, 2,746.2 km (1,706.4 mi) and 6,782 m (22,251 ft). On 28 December 1932, Furio Niclot and Mariano Lanciani used a 127 kW (170 hp) CNA C-7, 9-cylinder radial engined example to set the seaplane altitude record in its class at 7,362 m (24,154 ft). Swapping wheels for pontoons, the same aircraft went on to set the equivalent landplane record two days later at 9,282 m (30,453 ft). Long-distance feats included flights from Rome to Mogadishu and Vercelli to Tokyo (both by Francis Lombardi and Gino Capannini) and an aerial circumnavigation of Africa by Francis Lombardi, Count Lodovico Mazzotti, and Mario Rasini who covered 27,600 km (17,150 mi) in 54 days.

The TR.1 also had competition successes in 1931 in the Giro Aereo del Piedmonte and the Giro Aereo d'Italia.

Variants
 AS.1 - initial version with Fiat A.50 engine.
 AS.1 Idro - floatplane version.
 AS.1 Sci - ski-equipped version.
 AS.2 - version with strengthened structure and Fiat A.50 S engine.
 TR.1 - version with metal structure, shorter span wing (9.00 m; 29 ft 6.5 in) and enclosed cabin.

Operators

Brazilian Air Force - One aircraft.

Ethiopian Air Force

Spanish Air Force

Specifications (AS.1)

Notes

References

External links

Fiat in Flight, April 4, 1930

AS.1
1920s Italian sport aircraft
Parasol-wing aircraft
Single-engined tractor aircraft
Aircraft first flown in 1928